Nebria irregularis is a species of ground beetle in the Nebriinae subfamily that is endemic to Turkey.

References

irregularis
Beetles described in 1965
Beetles of Asia
Endemic fauna of Turkey